Claudia Keelan (b. 1959) is an American poet, writer, and professor. She received the Regents’ Creative Activities Award, at the University of Nevada, Los Vegas.

Life
Claudia Keelan is the author of seven collections of poetry, most recently We Step into the Sea: New and Selected Poems (Barrow  Street, 2018). Her book of translations Truth of My Songs: Poems of the Trobairitz, from Omnidawn Press appeared in 2016. Ecstatic Emigre was published in the Poets on Poetry Series from University of Michigan Press in 2018.

Widely anthologized, Keelan was described by the late Robert Creeley as a poet who "keeps the faith for us all" (book cover endorsement of Utopic).

She is the editor of Interim, a print and on line journal specializing in poetry, translation, belle lettres and book reviews (www.interimpoetics.com) as well as the editor for The Test Site Poetry Series (University of Nevada Press). She lives in Las Vegas where she is a Barrick Distinguished Scholar.

In 2017, she was part of a literary delegation to Cuba.

She was a judge for the 2021 PEN literary awards.

Bibliography
Full-Length Poetry Collections
 We Step into the SeaNew and Selected Poems (Barrow Street, 2018)
 O, Heart (Barrow Street, 2014)
 Missing Her (New Issues Poetry & Prose, 2009)
 The Devotion Field (Alice James Books, 2005 - Finalist, 2005 PEN Center USA Award in Poetry)
 Utopic (Alice James Books, 2000 Beatrice Hawley Award)
 The Secularist (University of Georgia, 1997 - Contemporary Poetry Series winner)
 Refinery (Cleveland State University 1994 - Cleveland State University Poetry Prize winner)

Other Works

 Ecstatic Émigré (University of Michigan Press, 2018)

Translation

 Truth of My Songs: Poems of the Trobairitz," (Omnidawn, 2015).

Chapbooks
 Of and among there was a locus(t) (Ahsahta Press, 2003)

Honors and awards
 2015 Barrick Distinguished Scholar
 2010 Creative Achievement Award
 2007 Jerome Shestack Award, The American Poetry Review
 2001 Silver Pen Award
 2000 Beatrice Hawley Award, Alice James Books for Utopic
1993 Robert D. Richardson Best Essay award for "Revising the Parade: Against the Poetry of Witness," Denver Quarterly 1997 ''The Secularist'' nominated for the Los Angeles Times Book Award
 1992 grant from the Kentucky Foundation for Women
 1991 fellowship from the Helene Wurlitzer Foundation of New Mexico
 1990 Jesse Stuart Award for excellence in teaching

References

External links
“Continuous Acts” Poetry Society of America
Apologue (1) poets.org
A Brief Interview with Claudia Keelan Omnidawn
Alice James Books Website
 Claudia Keelan Sample Poems: A Domestic Chapter, Antique, My Twentieth Century, Blue Diamond
 Range of the Possible: Conversations with Contemporary Poets, Tod Marshall, Eastern Washington University Press, May 2002
 Donald Revell & Claudia Keelan - Las Vegas, NV, Poets on Place, December 17, 2003
 Claudia Keelan & Alice Notley from A Conversation > The American Poetry Review > May 2004
 UNLV Magazine, Summer, 2007
 Reading Between A & B: Claudia Keelan - April 30, 2007

1959 births
Living people
Iowa Writers' Workshop faculty
Iowa Writers' Workshop alumni
Poets from California
American academics of English literature
People from Anaheim, California
American women poets
Journalists from California
American women non-fiction writers
21st-century American women